The following is the 1980–81 network television schedule for the three major English language commercial broadcast networks in the United States. The schedule covers primetime hours from September 1980 through August 1981. The schedule is followed by a list per network of returning series, new series, and series cancelled after the 1979–80 season. All times are Eastern and Pacific, with certain exceptions, such as Monday Night Football.

New series are highlighted in bold.

Each of the 30 highest-rated shows is listed with its rank and rating as determined by Nielsen Media Research.

 Yellow indicates the programs in the top 10 for the season.
 Cyan indicates the programs in the top 20 for the season.
 Magenta indicates the programs in the top 30 for the season.

PBS is not included; member stations have local flexibility over most of their schedules and broadcast times for network shows may vary.

Note: An actors' strike hindered the ability to start airing shows in a timely manner. The shows in the schedule were the first to air new episodes in their respective time periods as they bowed in between late August and December 31, 1980. Some of the new shows intended for a fall launch did not debut until 1982 or 1983, if at all.

 Sunday 

Note: On ABC, local and paid political programming aired in the 8-9 p.m. hour from September till November.

 Monday 

Note: Private Benjamin premiered April 6, 1981, at 8:00-8:30 pm on CBS.
Soap ran for three-and-a-half seasons on ABC in a 30-minute format. It was pulled from the Wednesday night schedule in January 1981 and returned on Mondays from March to April, when the final 12 episodes of the series ran as six 60-minute installments.

 Tuesday 

Note: On CBS, local and paid political programming aired in the 8-9 p.m. hour between September and November.  On NBC, NBC Tuesday Night at the Movies aired 8-10 p.m. from September till November.

 Wednesday 

Note: The Greatest American Hero Debuts on March 18, 1981, at 8:00pm on ABC

Note: NBC's Movie of the Week aired 9-11 p.m. between September and November.

Note: The Facts of Life Season 2 begins Wednesday, November 19, 1980, at 9:30 on NBC.

 Thursday 

Note: CBS Thursday Movie Special aired 9-11 p.m. from September till the end of November. Magnum, P.I. had a 2-hour premiere on December 11, 1980.

 Friday 

Note: NBC Friday Night at the Movies aired 8-10 p.m. through October and November.

 Saturday 

Note: The CBS Saturday Night Movies aired 9-11 p.m. through the end of November.

By network

ABC

Returning Series20/20240-RobertThe ABC Sunday Night MovieBarney MillerBensonCharlie's AngelsEight Is EnoughFantasy IslandHappy DaysHart to HartLaverne & ShirleyThe Love BoatMonday Night BaseballMonday Night FootballMork & MindySoapTaxiThat's Incredible!Three's CompanyVega$New SeriesAloha Paradise *American Dream *Bosom BuddiesBreaking AwayDynasty *Foul Play *The Greatest American Hero *I'm a Big Girl NowMaking a LivingThose Amazing AnimalsToo Close for ComfortNot returning from 1979–80:AngieThe AssociatesB.A.D. CatsDetective SchoolFamilyGalactica 1980Goodtime GirlsThe Lazarus SyndromeA New Kind of FamilyNobody's PerfectOne in a MillionOut of the BlueThe RopersSalvage 1StoneTenspeed and Brown ShoeWhen the Whistle BlowsCBS

Returning Series60 MinutesAliceArchie Bunker's PlaceDallasThe Dukes of HazzardFloHouse CallsThe Incredible HulkThe JeffersonsKnots LandingLou GrantM*A*S*HOne Day at a TimePalmerstown, U.S.A.Phyl & MikhyThat's My LineThe Tim Conway ShowTrapper John, M.D.Walter Cronkite's UniverseThe WaltonsThe White ShadowWKRP in CincinnatiNew SeriesChecking In *Concrete Cowboys *EnosFreebie and the BeanLadies' ManMagnum, P.I.Nurse *Park Place *Private Benjamin *Riker *Secrets of Midland HeightsThe Two of Us *

Not returning from 1979–80:The Bad News BearsBarnaby JonesBeyond WestworldBig Shamus, Little ShamusCalifornia FeverThe ChisholmsHagenHawaii Five-OThe Last ResortParisThe Stockard Channing ShowStruck by LightningUniverseWorking StiffsYoung MaverickNBC

Returning SeriesB.J. and the BearThe Big EventBuck Rogers in the 25th CenturyCHiPsDiff'rent StrokesDisney's Wonderful WorldThe Facts of LifeLittle House on the PrairieLoboNBC Monday Night at the MoviesQuincy, M.E.Real PeopleSanfordNew SeriesBarbara Mandrell and the Mandrell SistersThe Brady Brides *Flamingo Road *Games People PlayThe Gangster Chronicles *Harper Valley PTA *Hill Street BluesMarieNBC MagazineNumber 96 *Nero Wolfe *The Steve Allen Comedy HourWalking TallNot returning from 1979–80:The Big ShowEischiedFrom Here to EternityGood Time HarryHello, LarryHere's BoomerJoe's WorldA Man Called SloaneMe and MaxxKate Loves a MysteryPink LadyThe Rockford FilesSkagShirleyUnited States''

Note: The * indicates that the program was introduced in midseason.

References

United States primetime network television schedules
1980 in American television
1981 in American television